"Auprès de ma blonde" (French for "Next to My Girlfriend") or "Le Prisonnier de Hollande" ("The Prisoner of Holland") is a popular chanson dating to the 17th century. The song tells the story of a woman who laments to the birds in her father's garden that her husband is a prisoner in Holland. It appeared during or soon after the Franco-Dutch War (1672–78), during the reign of Louis XIV, when French sailors and soldiers were commonly imprisoned in the Netherlands.

The song's quick pace and lively melody made it well-suited to military marches, and it is still commonly played at parades. For the same reasons, it gained widespread popularity as a drinking song and nursery rhyme.

History
The song was composed in 1704 during the reign of Louis XIV. A local tradition attributes the composition to André Joubert du Collet.

Music

See also
Compagnies Franches de la Marine
Corps of Royal Canadian Electrical and Mechanical Engineers

References

French songs
French folk songs
18th-century songs
Songs about the Netherlands